Domenico de' Marini (died 27 April 1676) was a Roman Catholic prelate who served as Titular Archbishop of Teodosia (1669–1676).

Biography
On 2 December 1669, he was appointed during the papacy of Pope Clement IX as Titular Archbishop of Teodosia. On 18 May 1670, he was consecrated bishop by Pietro Vidoni, Cardinal-Priest of San Callisto, with Federico Baldeschi Colonna, Titular Archbishop of Caesarea in Cappadocia, and Francesco Maria Febei, Titular Archbishop of Tarsus, serving as co-consecrators. He served as Titular Archbishop of Teodosia until his death on 27 April 1676.

Episcopal succession
While bishop, he was the principal co-consecrator of: 
Pietro Isimbardi, Bishop of Cremona (1670); 
Carlo Loffredo, Bishop of Molfetta (1670); and
Francesco Arrigua, Bishop of Nicotera (1670).

References

External links and additional sources
 (for Chronology of Bishops) 
 (for Chronology of Bishops) 

17th-century Roman Catholic titular bishops
Bishops appointed by Pope Clement IX
1676 deaths